Erhard Hofeditz (born 7 December 1953) is a retired German footballer who played as a centre forward.

External links
 
 

1953 births
Living people
West German footballers
Association football forwards
TSV 1860 Munich players
1. FC Kaiserslautern players
Karlsruher SC players
Kickers Offenbach players
Bundesliga players
People from Wolfhagen
Sportspeople from Kassel (region)
Footballers from Hesse